Joseph Anton Schneiderfranken, also known as Bô Yin Râ (born 25 November 1876 in Aschaffenburg; died 14 February 1943 in Massagno/Lugano), was a German spiritual teacher, poet and painter. His legacy comprises forty books and close to two hundred paintings.

Biography
Schneiderfranken studied art in the 1890s and 1900s in spite of financial hardship, eventually becoming a professional painter in his thirties.  In 1912, he left for Greece.  Upon returning to Germany in 1914, he began teaching under the spiritual name Bô Yin Râ.

Again with Kurt Wolff, in 1920 Bô Yin Râ published a number of further works; some of these include The Book on The Royal Art, The Book on Life Beyond, The Book on Human Nature, The Book on Happiness, and The Book of Dialogues.

Schneiderfranken influenced author Gustav Meyrink, composer Felix Weingartner, and Eckhart Tolle.

Notes

External links

19th-century German painters
19th-century German male artists
German male painters
20th-century German painters
20th-century German male artists
1876 births
1943 deaths
German male writers